Melbourne City Football Club is an Australian professional association football club based in Bundoora in Melbourne. The club was formed in 2009 as Melbourne Heart before it was renamed to Melbourne City in 2014.

Melbourne City's first team have competed in the A-League Men. Melbourne City's first A-League match was against the Central Coast Mariners, and they met their 14th and most recent different league opponent, Macarthur FC, for the first time in the 2020–21 A-League season. The team that Melbourne City have played most in league competition is Adelaide United; who they first met in the 2010–11 A-League season. The 17 defeats from 38 meetings against Perth Glory is more than they have lost against any other club. Adelaide United have drawn 13 league encounters with Melbourne City, more than any other club. Melbourne City have recorded more league victories against Brisbane Roar than against any other club, having beaten them 20 times.

Key
The table includes results of matches played by Melbourne City in the A-League Men regular season and Finals series.
The name used for each opponent is the name they had when Melbourne City most recently played a league match against them.
The columns headed "First" and "Last" contain the first and most recent seasons in which Melbourne City played league matches against each opponent.
P = matches played; W = matches won; D = matches drawn; L = matches lost; Win% = percentage of total matches won
  Clubs with this background and symbol in the "Opponent" column are Melbourne City's divisional rivals in the current season.
  Clubs with this background and symbol in the "Opponent" column are defunct.

All-time league record
Statistics correct as at match played 19 March 2023

References
General
 
 
 

League Record By Opponent
Melbourne City FC